Gonzalo Martínez Corbalá (10 March 1928 – 15 October 2017) was a Mexican politician and diplomat.

A member of the Institutional Revolutionary Party who served for a time as president of the party's Mexico City chapter, Martínez Corbalá was first elected to the Chamber of Deputies in 1964 and served until 1967. He was ambassador to Chile between 1972 and 1974 when he witnessed the 1973 Chilean coup d'état against Salvador Allende. Martínez Corbalá was appointed ambassador to Cuba, from 1980 to 1982. He sat in the Senate for two terms, between 1982 and 1988, when he returned to the Chamber of Deputies. Near the end of 1990, Martínez Corbalá was named the director-general of the Instituto del Fondo Nacional de la Vivienda para los Trabajadores, and took office as governor of San Luis Potosí in 1991. He stepped down in 1992, and later led the Institute for Social Security and Services for State Workers between 1993 and 1994. In 1992, the government of Chile awarded Martínez Corbalá the Grand Cross of the Order of Merit.

He was the President of the Chamber of Deputies in 1990.

Outside of politics, Martínez Corbalá was president of the Association of Engineers. He died at the age of 89 on 15 October 2017.

References

1928 births
2017 deaths
20th-century Mexican engineers
Institutional Revolutionary Party politicians
Governors of San Luis Potosí
Members of the Chamber of Deputies (Mexico)
Members of the Senate of the Republic (Mexico)
Presidents of the Senate of the Republic (Mexico)
Presidents of the Chamber of Deputies (Mexico)
20th-century Mexican politicians
Ambassadors of Mexico to Chile
Ambassadors of Mexico to Cuba